Sodium acetate, CH3COONa, also abbreviated NaOAc, is the sodium salt of acetic acid. This colorless deliquescent salt has a wide range of uses.

Applications

Biotechnological
Sodium acetate is used as the carbon source for culturing bacteria. Sodium acetate is also useful for increasing yields of DNA isolation by ethanol precipitation.

Industrial
Sodium acetate is used in the textile industry to neutralize sulfuric acid waste streams and also as a photoresist while using aniline dyes. It is also a pickling agent in chrome tanning and helps to impede vulcanization of chloroprene in synthetic rubber production. In processing cotton for disposable cotton pads, sodium acetate is used to eliminate the buildup of static electricity.

Concrete longevity
Sodium acetate is used to mitigate water damage to concrete by acting as a concrete sealant, while also being environmentally benign and cheaper than the commonly used epoxy alternative for sealing concrete against water permeation.

Food
Sodium acetate may be added to food as a seasoning, sometimes in the form of sodium diacetate, a one-to-one complex of sodium acetate and acetic acid, given the E-number E262. It is often used to give potato chips a salt and vinegar flavour, and may be used as a substitute for vinegar itself on potato chips as it doesn't add moisture to the final product. Sodium acetate (anhydrous) is widely used as a shelf-life extending agent, pH control agent. It is safe to eat at low concentration.

Buffer solution
A solution of sodium acetate (a basic salt of acetic acid) and acetic acid can act as a buffer to keep a relatively constant pH level. This is useful especially in biochemical applications where reactions are pH-dependent in a mildly acidic range (pH 4–6).

Heating pad

Sodium acetate is also used in heating pads, hand warmers, and hot ice. When they are heated past the melting point and subsequently allowed to cool, the aqueous solution becomes supersaturated. This solution is capable of cooling to room temperature without forming crystals. By pressing on a metal disc within the heating pad, a nucleation center is formed, causing the solution to crystallize back into solid sodium acetate trihydrate. The bond-forming process of crystallization is exothermic. The latent heat of fusion is about 264–289 kJ/kg. Unlike some types of heat packs, such as those dependent upon irreversible chemical reactions, a sodium acetate heat pack can be easily reused by immersing the pack in boiling water for a few minutes, until the crystals are completely dissolved, and allowing the pack to slowly cool to room temperature.

Preparation

For laboratory use, sodium acetate is inexpensive and usually purchased instead of being synthesized. It is sometimes produced in a laboratory experiment by the reaction of acetic acid, commonly in the 5–8% solution known as vinegar, with sodium carbonate ("washing soda"), sodium bicarbonate ("baking soda"), or sodium hydroxide ("lye", or "caustic soda"). Any of these reactions produce sodium acetate and water. When a sodium and carbonate ion-containing compound is used as the reactant, the carbonate anion from sodium bicarbonate or carbonate, reacts with the hydrogen from the carboxyl group (-COOH) in acetic acid, forming carbonic acid. Carbonic acid readily decomposes under normal conditions into gaseous carbon dioxide and water. This is the reaction taking place in the well-known "volcano" that occurs when the household products, baking soda and vinegar, are combined.
CH3COOH + NaHCO3 → CH3COONa + 
 →  + 

Industrially, sodium acetate trihydrate is prepared by reacting acetic acid with sodium hydroxide using water as the solvent.
CH3COOH + NaOH → CH3COONa + H2O.

To manufacture anhydrous sodium acetate industrially, the Niacet Process is used.  Sodium metal ingots are extruded through a die to form a ribbon of sodium metal, usually under an inert gas atmosphere such as N2 then immersed in anhydrous acetic acid.
2 CH3COOH + 2 Na →2 CH3COONa + H2.

The hydrogen gas is normally a valuable byproduct.

Structure
The crystal structure of anhydrous sodium acetate has been described as alternating sodium-carboxylate and methyl group layers. Sodium acetate trihydrate's structure consists of distorted octahedral coordination at sodium. Adjacent octahedra share edges to form one-dimensional chains. Hydrogen bonding in two dimensions between acetate ions and water of hydration links the chains into a three-dimensional network.

Reactions
Sodium acetate can be used to form an ester with an alkyl halide such as bromoethane:
 CH3COONa + BrCH2CH3 → CH3COOCH2CH3 + NaBr

Sodium acetate undergoes decarboxylation to form methane (CH4) under forcing conditions (pyrolysis in the presence of sodium hydroxide):

 CH3COONa + NaOH → CH4 + Na2CO3

Calcium oxide is the typical catalyst used for this reaction.
Cesium salts also catalyze this reaction.

References

External links

Hot Ice – Instructions, Pictures, and Videos
How Sodium Acetate heating pads work

Acetates
E-number additives
Food additives
Organic sodium salts
Photographic chemicals